Adhir Ranjan Chowdhury (born 2 April 1956) is an Indian politician serving as the leader of the Indian National Congress in the 17th Lok Sabha and the Member of Parliament from Berhampore. He is also the current president of West Bengal Pradesh Congress Committee following the demise of Somendra Nath Mitra.

Personal life
Chowdhury was born on 2 April 1956 to Niranjan and Saroja Bala Chowdhury at Berhampore in Murshidabad district, West Bengal. He studied at I.C. Institute in Berhampore.

Chowdhury married Arpita Chowdhury on 15 September 1987. They had a daughter, Shreyashi, who died in October 2006. On 9 January 2019, Arpita died. He later married Atashi C Chowdhury.

Political career
Chowdhury joined the Indian National Congress party during the premiership of Rajiv Gandhi. In 1991, he contested the West Bengal Legislative Assembly election from Nabagram constituency. During the polling, he was chased by 300 supporters of the Communist Party of India (Marxist) and held hostage by its candidate. Chowdhury lost by a margin of 1,401 votes. In 1996, he was elected from the same constituency. Chowdhury polled 76,852 votes and won by a margin of approximately 20,329 votes.

Chowdhury contested the 1999 Indian general election from Berhampore constituency. He won by a margin of 95,391 votes and defeated his nearest rival, the sitting MP Pramothes Mukherjee of Revolutionary Socialist Party. Following his success, he was made the Congress president for the Murshidabad district. Between 1999 and 2000, he served as a member of Committee on Information Technology, Railway Convention Committee and Committee to Review the Rate of Dividend Payable by the Railway Undertaking to the General Revenues. Between 2000 and 2004, he served as a member of Consultative Committee of the Ministry of External Affairs. In 2003, under Chowdhury's leadership, the Congress party won 23 out of 33 zilla parishad seats, 13 out of 26 panchayat samitis and 104 out of 254 village councils in Murshidabad.

On 28 October 2012 he was inducted in the Union Ministry under Prime Minister Manmohan Singh as Minister of State for Railways.

 
After taking charge as Minister of State for Railways, he has reviewed the statutes of safety, punctuality and passenger amenities with Board Members and inspected Sealdah, Howrah, Beharampur etc. railway stations to check adequacy of passenger amenities.

He became the president of West Bengal Pradesh Congress on 10 February 2014.

Leader of the Congress in Lok Sabha
In June 2019, he was selected as Congress leader in Lok Sabha. According to a report in NDTV, Adhir Ranjan Chowdhury was given the job after the party failed to convince Rahul Gandhi.
On 26 July 2019, Chowdhury was appointed the chairman of Seventeenth Lok Sabha Committee on Public Accounts. The Public Accounts Committee is now constituted every year under Rule 308 of the Rules of Procedure and Conduct of Business in Lok Sabha.

After passing away of Somen Mitra, the then president of West Bengal Pradesh Congress Committee, on 9 September 2020, Chowdhury was appointed  the president of West Bengal Pradesh Congress Committee.

On 12 January 2022, Congress leader in the Lok Sabha, Adhir Ranjan Chowdhury wrote to the chairman of the Parliamentary Standing Committee on Home Affairs, Anand Sharma, asking the committee to discuss the "Violative Software Application 'Tek Fog'", in their next meeting.

On 28 July 2022, he referred to Droupadi Murmu, President of India as "Rashtrapatni" instead of "Rashtrapati". Senior BJP leaders condemned the comment. Later, he apologized by writing a letter to Murmu on 29 July. In the letter he cited slipped tongue and not knowing Hindi properly the reason.

References

External links
 
 Official biographical sketch in Parliament of India website (cache site)

 

|-

 

|-

 

1956 births
Indian National Congress politicians from West Bengal
Living people
People from Murshidabad district
India MPs 2004–2009
India MPs 2009–2014
Lok Sabha members from West Bengal
India MPs 2014–2019
India MPs 1999–2004
India MPs 2019–present